Petford is a rural locality in the Shire of Mareeba, Queensland, Australia.

Geography 
Emu Creek flows through from east to north, where it joins the Walsh River as it forms part of the northern boundary. California Creek, a tributary of the Tate River, forms much of the southern boundary. Two other tributaries of the Tate River, Oaky Creek and Martin Creek, rise in the locality.

The former mining town of Lappa is within the locality.

History 
The locality takes its name from the railway station which was named after John Joseph Petford, an official of Queensland Railways Department for many years. The railway station was on the Chillagoe Railway & Mining Co. line from Mareeba to Mount Garnet which opened its first section from Mareeba to Lappa, just south-west of Petford, in 1900. The station no longer operates, but the line still exists, with the Savannahlander tourist train passing through Petford on its way between Cairns and Forsayth.

Lappa Lappa Provisional School opened in 1900 and closed circa 1901.

Koorboora Provisional School opened on 1903. On 1 January 1909 it became Koorboora State School. It closed circa 1926.

Bamford Provisional School opened on 23 January 1905. The school closed in 1907 but reopened in 1908. On 1 January 1909 it became Bamford State School. It closed on 2 August 1935.

Emuford Provisional State School opened circa 1910 and closed circa 1921.

Petford State School opened on 5 August 1935 and closed in 1962. It reopened on 27 January 1976 and closed finally on 15 December 1995. It was at 21 Bamford Road.

References 

Shire of Mareeba
Localities in Queensland